Richard Gelke (born May 19, 1992) is a German professional ice hockey player who is currently playing for the Schwenninger Wild Wings  in the Deutsche Eishockey Liga (DEL). After playing within the Adler Mannheim organization to begin his professional career, Gelke left to sign a one-year contract with Schwenninger Wild Wings for their return to the DEL on May 10, 2013.

References

External links

1992 births
Adler Mannheim players
Living people
German ice hockey forwards
People from Reutlingen
Sportspeople from Tübingen (region)